Puleston is a surname. Notable people with the surname include:
Dennis E. Puleston (1940–1978), American archaeologist and ecologist
Dennis Puleston (1905–2001), British-born American environmentalist, adventurer and designer
Hamlet Puleston (1632–1662), English academic, known as a political writer
John Henry Puleston (1830–1908), Welsh journalist and entrepreneur in the United States, later a Conservative politician
John Puleston (judge) (1583–1659), Welsh barrister and judge
Robert Puleston, brother-in-law and supporter of Owain Glyndŵr, at the time of his rebellion against King Henry IV of England
Robert Puleston (MP) (1526–1583), Welsh politician
Roger Puleston (1565–1618), Welsh politician who sat in the House of Commons at various times between 1584 and 1611
William D. Puleston (1881–1968), American naval officer and author
also
Ian Puleston-Davies (born 1958), British actor and writer
Puleston baronets, of Emral in the County of Flint, was a title in the Baronetage of the United Kingdom

See also 
Puleston Cross